Sandeep Aur Pinky Faraar is a 2021 Indian Hindi-language black comedy drama film directed and produced by Dibakar Banerjee with distribution by Yash Raj Films. Parineeti Chopra and Arjun Kapoor star in lead roles. The filming began on 7 November 2017 in Mahipalpur. Initially scheduled for theatrical release on 20 March 2020, the film was postponed due to COVID-19 pandemic in India. After being delayed for a year, it was finally released theatrically on 19 March 2021 and later on Amazon Prime.

Made on the budget of 20 crores the film grossed 58.125 lakhs globally, emerging as a box office bomb. The critical reception was mixed-to-positive with praise towards the storyline, performances(particularly Chopra), Banerjee's direction and social commentary but criticism towards its slow pacing.

At the 67th Filmfare Awards, Sandeep Aur Pinky Faraar received 10 nominations, including Best Film (Critics), Best Actress (Chopra) and Best Supporting Actress (Gupta), and won Best Dialogue (Grover & Banerjee).

Plot 
The film opens with a group of friends joking in their SUV while returning home from a party when suddenly, they are killed in a rain of bullets. Several hours earlier, Sandeep Kaur Walia a.k.a. Sandy, a top executive at Parivartan Bank, is waiting for her boss, Parichay, for a dinner date at an upscale restaurant. She meets a journalist, Purva, who invites her to a party later in the evening. Outside, Sandy meets Satinder Dahiya alias "Pinky", who informs her that he is a cop with Haryana police and Parichay has sent a car to take her to a different location. Sandy is annoyed by Pinky's driving, especially since he is continuously on the phone with his boss (informing him of their location) and reveals that she is three months pregnant. Pinky encounters hooting from an SUV of young men and when his boss asks for his car's license plate number, he gives the number of the SUV.

The SUV is stopped at a police checkpost and they start firing indiscriminately at it, as shown in the first scene. Pinky, who is behind the SUV, witnesses the massacre and drives to an isolated place. He concludes that Sandy was the actual target and the police wanted to kill him as well to make Sandy a casualty in a failed operation on a suspended police officer. Pinky calls up his boss Tyagi, the head of a private security firm, who tries to calm him down and demands answers from Sandy but she remains evasive.

Sandy takes Pinky to the party Purva invited her to in order to relax and get a sense of the situation, where she finds that her SM accounts are blocked. The police track her and the duo flees the party. Pinky briefly considers killing Sandy to protect himself but cannot go through with it. He plans to go to Nepal and Sandy asks Pinky to take her with him, promising a million rupees in exchange. They travel by train and then bus to Pithoragarh, a border town to Nepal. Upset by the unsanitary conditions around her, Sandy requests a friendly couple, Aunty and Uncle, in the market to take them as paying guests. Pinky finds an agent who will create fake documents for them to cross over.

Uncle reveals that he has invested four lakhs in the 'Swabhiman' scheme of Parivartan Bank. Sandy is alarmed and helps him to withdraw his money from the scheme. Sandy reveals to Pinky that the Swabhiman scheme was her brainchild: a fraudulent scheme designed to get a vast number of depositors in a small-time to save her sinking bank. During this time, she had an affair with her boss and became pregnant. Sandy wanted to resign after taking her share of 32 crores for the sake of her child, which Parichay refused and is the reason he wants to kill her. She gets Uncle a refund from the scheme at the bank by offering the manager a chance to embezzle a few million rupees using her intimate knowledge of its operations.

Later that night, when the funds are transferred, Parichay's team in Delhi is alerted to Sandy's location. The bank manager recognizes Sandy and tries to rape her but she fights him off and consequently suffers a miscarriage. Pinky tends to Sandy's wounds and cremates her foetus. Sandy cannot bear this loss and goes into shock. Pinky tries to help her recover and they grow closer.

Tyagi traces the two to a wedding procession which they were supposed to use as a guise to cross the border. Pinky learns of this and calls Tyagi, asking him to let Sandy pass in return for the 1 million he had earlier received from her and his surrender but his boss refuses. Sandy decides to settle some scores and convinces Pinky to leave without her. She returns to the city while Pinky cross-dresses and escapes the police check post.

Sandy understands that if Tyagi's team gets hold of her, she would be killed. She instead surrenders herself to the local police and exposes the scam of Parivartan Bank. Purva visits Sandy in jail and tells her about Parichay's arrest, with six cases of fraud filed against him. Purva points out that Sandy could have received a lighter sentence and more sympathy if she disclosed her miscarriage but Sandy refuses. Purva then gives Sandy a package from P. Thapa, which has been posted from Nepal, addressed to her. It contains only a few photos of kids dancing in a Bollywood dance school in Nepal. Sandy understands it's from Pinky and smiles.

Cast 
Parineeti Chopra as Sandeep "Sandy" Kaur Walia
Arjun Kapoor as Satinder "Pinky" Dahiya
Jaideep Ahlawat as Tyagi
Raghubir Yadav as Uncle
Neena Gupta as Aunty
Dinker Sharma as Parichay
Daljeet Singh as Bose
Jaipreet Singh as Garry Ji
Rahul Kumar as Munna
Dev Chauhan  as Nihal
Abhishek Yadav  as Harshad
Suruchi Aulakh as Purva

Production 
Yash Raj Films announced the film on 3 July 2017. It marks the third collaboration between Kapoor and Chopra after they starred together in Ishaqzaade (2012), which was followed by the two pairing up again in Namaste England (2018).

On 30 October 2017, Arjun Kapoor shared an image of his character which is shown to be a cop. On 27 March 2018, the second look of both actors came out giving a glimpse of their different worlds.

Filming took place at the nearby places (Pithoragarh) of Indo-Nepal border of Uttarakhand. To get into their characters, Banerjee insisted the two not to communicate with each other prior to filming and even off-screen. Filming of Arjun's portion wrapped up on 17 January 2018.

Soundtrack 

The film's soundtrack is composed by Anu Malik, Dibakar Banerjee, Narendra Chandra and Kamlesh Haripuri, with lyrics written by Anu Malik, Dibakar Banerjee, Pardhaan, Narendra Chandra, Sangeeta Chandra and Kamlesh Haripuri. The film's background score is composed by Dibakar Banerjee.

Release 
Initially scheduled for release on 20 March 2020, the film release was postponed due to the COVID-19 pandemic. The producers announced in May 2020 that the film's release had been postponed until theatres reopen. The film was released in theatres on 19 March 2021.

Reception

Critical response
Upon release, the film received mixed reviews from the film critics who generally praised the performances of the lead actors, particularly of Chopra's but criticised the film for its slow pacing. 

Saibal Chatterjee of NDTV awarded the film 3.5 stars (out of 5) and wrote, ‘‘Sandeep Aur Pinky Faraar is an inspired cinematic essay that draws strength from upending time-worn tics’’. Shubhra Gupta of The Indian Express gave the film 3 stars (out of 5) and wrote, ‘‘Dibakar Banerji, who has a nuanced eye when it comes to depicting power play and class differences in the NCR, should have given us a tighter film’’. Sukanya Verma of Rediff gave the film 3 stars (out of 5) and stated, ‘‘Sandeep Aur Pinky Faraar is an intriguing mess’’. Stutee Ghosh of The Quint gave the film a score of 3 (out of 5) and wrote, ‘‘Devoid of excesses and dramatic highs, the sparseness with which Banerjee steers the story adds meaning and subtly. While mainstream Bollywood fares spell out every little detail and even hammer it repeatedly, Sandeep Aur Pinky Faraar fervently sticks to its austerity’’. Anupama Chopra of Film Companion wrote, ‘‘Sandeep Aur Pinky Faraar doesn't have the pacing that you might expect in a chase film. The narrative has long stretches that plod dangerously. But ultimately, Dibakar steers it to a climax that is both stinging and satisfying’’.

Anna M. M. Vetticad of Firstpost gave the film 2.75 stars (out of 5) and wrote, ‘‘The film is a mixed bag but I found myself drawn to its quietude and to its heartening conviction that kindness may be found in the most unexpected places and the most unexpected persons could turn out to be allies, sometimes without the expectation of anything in return’’. Ronak Kotecha of Times of India gave 2.5 stars (out of 5) and wrote, ‘‘Sandeep Aur Pinky Faraar is one of those neo-noir films that set out with a promise to engage, entertain and educate by slowly unraveling its layered subtext. But with its preposterous execution and frustratingly slow pace, it’s the audience who might want to escape, much before Sandeep and Pinky’’. Film critic based at Bollywood Hungama gave the film 2 stars (out of 5) and wrote, ‘‘Sandeep Aur Pinky Faraar has a bearable first half but goes terribly downhill in the second hour’’. However, they praised Chopra and Kapoor by stating that they delivered a ‘‘convincing’’ and ‘‘restrained’’ respectively. Tanul Thakur of The Wire (India) called the film “a joyless, drab watch” and stated that its Banerjee’s most ‘‘underwhelming’’ movie. He wrote, ‘‘The most obvious culprits are the lead actors who struggle to bring any kind of magnetism or chemistry to their roles’’.

Box office
The film was released in 375 screens on 19 March 2021. The film earned 6 lakhs on its opening day and the opening weekend collection was 20 lakhs.

In its complete theatrical run the film grossed  lakh in India and  lakh overseas, for a worldwide gross collection of  lakhs.

Accolades

Home media 
On 20 May 2021, the movie began streaming on Amazon Prime Video and was positively received.

References

External links 
 
 

Films postponed due to the COVID-19 pandemic
Films set in Delhi
2020s Hindi-language films
Indian black comedy films
Films scored by Anu Malik
Films distributed by Yash Raj Films
Films directed by Dibakar Banerjee
2021 black comedy films